Afolabi Oladipo Christopher "Dipo" Akinyemi (born 10 June 1997) is a professional footballer who plays as a forward for Scottish Championship club Ayr United.

Akinyemi began his career in the youth academy at Potters Bar Town in 2011, breaking into the first team in 2014. He subsequently joined Stevenage's academy at the end of that year, before making his first-team debut at the start of the 2015–16 season. During his time at Stevenage, Akinyemi was loaned out to Aldershot Town, St Neots Town, Dulwich Hamlet on two occasions, St Albans City, Billericay Town and Bishop's Stortford respectively. 

Akinyemi signed for Dulwich on a permanent basis in March 2018 and helped the club to promotion to the National League South during the remainder of the 2017–18 season. Akinyemi joined Cheshunt on loan in August 2019. He left Dulwich to sign for Braintree Town in November 2019, before joining divisional rivals Welling United a month later. After spending three seasons at Welling, Akinyemi signed for Scottish Championship club Ayr United in June 2022.

Career

Potters Bar Town
Akinyemi started his career playing in the youth team of Potters Bar Town, joining the Hertfordshire club's youth set-up in 2011 having impressed youth manager John Gibbs whilst playing Sunday league football. Akinyemi was part of the Potters Bar under-18 team that defeated full-time academy teams in consecutive years in the FA Youth Cup. After three years playing in the youth team for Potters Bar, Akinyemi made his first-team debut on 6 September 2014, starting the match and scoring in the second-half in a 4–0 away victory against Bedford Town. He made seven league appearances in the Southern Football League Division One Central over the next two months.

Stevenage and loan spells
After gaining first-team experience at Potters Bar, Akinyemi joined League Two club Stevenage's academy at the end of 2014. He trained with the Stevenage first-team towards the end of the 2014–15 season and was an unused substitute in two of the club's league matches in April 2015. Akinyemi signed a professional contract with Stevenage in the summer of 2015, before making his debut under new manager Teddy Sheringham when he started in the opening league game of the 2015–16 season, a 2–0 defeat to Notts County at Broadhall Way. He scored his first goal for the club in his third appearance, scoring the first goal of the game when he "finished off a fine counter attack" in an eventual 2–2 draw away at Newport County on 15 August 2015. Akinyemi made 16 appearances during the season, the majority of which came in the first half of the season, scoring one goal.

Akinyemi joined National League club Aldershot Town on a one-month loan agreement on 10 November 2015. The loan move was to help aid Akinyemi's development and gain further first-team experience. He scored on his debut for Aldershot a day after signing, in an eventual 2–1 home defeat to Lincoln City. Akinyemi made four appearances during the month's loan, scoring once, before returning to his parent club at the start of December 2015. Aside from two substitute appearances upon his return from Aldershot, Akinyemi found first-team opportunities limited at Stevenage, and he subsequently joined Southern Football League Premier Division club St Neots Town on 6 February 2016 on a one month loan. Akinyemi made six appearances there, his one goal coming in St Neots' 3–1 home victory against Bideford in his second appearance. He then joined Isthmian League Premier Division club Dulwich Hamlet on loan on 25 March 2016, for the remainder of the season. He scored on his debut for Dulwich, scoring the club's second goal in a 2–2 draw away at Enfield Town on 27 March 2016. He scored five goals in seven games during the loan spell as Dulwich missed out on promotion via the play-offs, returning to Stevenage upon the expiry of the loan agreement.

Ahead of the 2016–17 season, Akinyemi joined St Albans City of the National League South on a loan deal until January 2017. He scored on his debut on the opening day of the season when he scored the first goal in a 2–0 home victory against Concord Rangers at Clarence Park. Akinyemi was recalled by Stevenage at the end of November 2016 having made 21 appearances in all competitions during the loan spell, 11 of which as a substitute, scoring five times. Stevenage stated their intention to loan out Akinyemi straight away and he joined Isthmian League Premier Division club Billericay Town on 6 December 2016 on a one-month loan deal. He made seven appearances during the month at Billericay, scoring one goal. At the start of January 2017, Akinyemi rejoined Dulwich Hamlet on loan for the remainder of the season, scoring the first goal of his second spell in a 2–0 victory against Needham Market on 18 February 2017. Three days later, Akinyemi scored four goals in Dulwich's 7–1 victory against Barkingside in the London Senior Cup, all four goals coming within the space of 14 second-half minutes. He scored 10 times in 19 appearances in all competitions during the loan spell.

Akinyemi signed for Southern Football League Premier Division club Bishop's Stortford on a season-long loan agreement on 26 July 2017. The move meant that Akinyemi was reunited with Bishop's Stortford manager Kevin Watson, who was assistant manager at Stevenage when Akinyemi broke into the first-team. He debuted for Stortford on the opening day of the 2017–18 season, playing the whole match in a 2–1 defeat away at Tiverton Town on 12 August 2017. Akinyemi scored his first goal for the club in a 5–0 away victory against Dunstable Town on 26 September 2017. He scored 10 times in 36 appearances in all competitions, including four goals in his final four games for the club throughout February 2018. The season-long loan deal was cut short when he was recalled by Stevenage at the start of March 2018.

Dulwich Hamlet
Upon his recall, Akinyemi signed for Isthmian League Premier Division club Dulwich Hamlet on a permanent basis on 6 March 2018, having previously been on loan at the south London club on two separate occasions earlier in his career. Stevenage allowed him to join Dulwich on a free transfer, in return for a "significant percentage of any future sale". He made his third Dulwich debut on the same day his signing was announced, scoring twice in a 3–1 away victory at league leaders Billericay Town. He made 14 appearances and scored four goals in all competitions as Dulwich won promotion to the National League South after winning the Isthmian League Premier Division play-offs. Akinyemi scored the decisive penalty in the final as Dulwich earned a 4–3 victory on penalties over Hendon after the two teams had played out a 1–1 draw after extra-time. He played regularly during Dulwich's first season in the National League South, scoring 16 times in 41 appearances.

Having made three appearances for Dulwich at the start of the 2019–20 season, Akinyemi joined Cheshunt of the Isthmian League Premier Division on a two-month loan deal on 25 August 2019. He made his debut for Cheshunt in the club's 1–1 draw with Corinthian Casuals a day later and scored his first goal for the club in a 2–1 home defeat to Bognor Regis Town on 14 September 2019. Akinyemi scored five times in 10 appearances during the two-month loan agreement.

Welling United
With first-team opportunities limited back at Dulwich, he signed for fellow National League South club Braintree Town on 22 November 2019. After three appearances at Braintree, he moved to another National League South club in the form of Welling United on 13 December 2019. He scored four times in 12 appearances during the remainder of the 2019–20 season, which was curtailed due to the COVID-19 pandemic in March 2020. Akinyemi scored three goals in nine matches in the opening two months of the 2020–21 season, as Welling's season was curtailed for the second successive season due to restrictions associated with the COVID-19 pandemic. Akinyemi scored 18 times in 38 appearances during the 2021–22 season as Welling avoided relegation on the final day of the season.

Ayr United
Akinyemi joined Scottish Championship club Ayr United on a two-year contract on 3 June 2022. He debuted for Ayr in the club's 3–0 victory against Elgin City in the Scottish League Cup on 9 July 2022. Akinyemi scored his first two goals for the club in a 3–2 league victory away at Queen's Park on 5 August 2022, including a 92nd-minute penalty to win the match.

Style of play
Akinyemi has always been deployed as a centre forward. His youth manager at Potters Bar Town, John Gibbs, stated he was particularly impressed with Akinyemi's work ethic and strength, also singling out his attitude and dedication as plus-points. He has also been described as being "pacy and strong" and "a real threat".

Career statistics

Honours
Dulwich Hamlet
 Isthmian League Premier Division play-offs: 2017–18

References

External links

1997 births
Living people
Black British sportspeople
English footballers
Association football forwards
People from Enfield, London
Potters Bar Town F.C. players
Stevenage F.C. players
Aldershot Town F.C. players
St Neots Town F.C. players
Dulwich Hamlet F.C. players
St Albans City F.C. players
Billericay Town F.C. players
Bishop's Stortford F.C. players
Cheshunt F.C. players
Braintree Town F.C. players
Welling United F.C. players
Ayr United F.C. players
English Football League players
National League (English football) players
Southern Football League players
Isthmian League players